Mike Posavad (born  January 3, 1964) is a Canadian former professional ice hockey player who played eight games in the National Hockey League for the St. Louis Blues.

Career statistics

External links

1964 births
Canadian ice hockey defencemen
Living people
Peoria Rivermen (IHL) players
Peterborough Petes (ice hockey) players
Salt Lake Golden Eagles (CHL) players
Sportspeople from Brantford
St. Louis Blues draft picks
St. Louis Blues players